Jane Wright (born 1954 in Ontario, Canada) is an entomologist who discovered the dung beetle Neochara wrightee (named after her) while working for the Entomology division of Commonwealth Scientific and Industrial Research Organization (CSIRO) researching predatory dung beetles in Africa.

Wright earned her Bachelor of Science (Hons) degree from Queen’s University, Canada in 1976.  She earned her Masters of Science degree in 1978 from the University of Guelph, Canada while researching the biology of lady beetles. She went on to earn her doctorate in 1984 from the University of California, Berkeley, US while researching the biology of parasitic wasps.

From 1984 to 1998 Wright worked on biological control for CSIRO researching dung breeding flies in South Africa.  From 1997 to 2005 she was the head of CSIRO’s Stored Grain Research Laboratory (SGRL). In 1998 Wright moved to Canberra, Australia continuing her work for the entomology division of CSIRO, commercializing fumigant technology and managing operations.  Wright retired in 2009 and has been an Honorary Fellow at CSIRO working on a project to introduce more dung beetles to Australia.

Early life and education

Jane Wright was born in Ontario in 1954. She attended Queens University in Kingston, Ontario. Her interest in entomology led her to the University of Guelph, Southern Ontario, the only university in Canada with an entomology department. At the University of Guelph, working on her master's degree Wright decided to study apple maggots but professor John Laing persuaded her to study ladybird beetles instead as not as much research had been done on them.  Wright did much field work studying ladybird beetles, determining the conditions during the winter that made them most likely to survive. The conditions for research were difficult involving carrying packs of tools, traps and specimens through areas without roads. She dug traps of specimens out of frozen ground to recover them.

After graduating from the University of Guelph, Wright enrolled at Berkeley, California in the United States. At the time, no university in Canada offered a PhD program in entomology. Wright studied parasitic wasps in quarantine.  She found that wasps chose their host scale insects in which to lay their eggs based on their size. If the wasp eggs were female they were most likely to survive in a larger host while male eggs were able to survive and develop in smaller hosts.

Career

Following her PhD, Wright worked with CSIRO-Australia researching dung beetles in Africa. The buffalo fly in both Africa and Australia is a pest to livestock, taking up to 20 blood-meals a day causing bleeding ulcerations. CSIRO-Australia was seeking a parasitic insect that could be imported from Africa to Australia to control the buffalo fly population. Dung beetles feed on the larvae of buffalo flies as they develop in animal dung and had already been identified as a possibility for controlling the buffalo fly’s population when Wright joined the CSIRO-Australia research team in Africa. There are over 250 species of dung beetles that feed on buffalo fly and use their bodies as parasitic hosts; identifying which species would best serve the purpose was the research that Wright continued.

In researching the different beetles that grew in animal dung Wright came across species that had not yet been named. The specialists named this new small African species of beetle Aleochara wrightii after Wright.

The CSIRO-Australia led dung beetle research in Africa went on for almost 20 years and Wright contributed to that research for more than two years. Those funding the research decided to change their priorities and Wright and her group were forced to pack up their research camp in Africa. Wright salvaged her research once back in Brisbane Australia and distributed imported dung beetles to Australia. They are making a positive impact on keeping the harmful population of buffalo flies under control today.

Wright next found work again with CSIRO-Australia in their Division of Entomology as an insect ecologist/behaviorists in Canberra, Australia. She researched stored grain beetles and how they cause harm to grain kept in silos.

Wright then began work for the Stored Grain Research Laboratory in Australia to control the warehouse beetle and its harmful impact on stored grains and stored grain commodities. The warehouse beetle is not indigenous to Australia and originally an attempt was made to eradicate them. Wright worked with other researchers to find that the warehouse beetle had spread from plants and silos with stored grain into the wild across Australia and that complete eradication was impossible. Wright and her team found the most effective amounts of heat and fumigants used in grain to control the warehouse beetle.

Wright became the deputy head of the Stored Grain Research Laboratory.

Wright was asked if she saw any discrimination in the workplace as a female scientist. She said that she encountered remarkably little, but during a time that she was applying for work during her final year at Berkeley a person at a conference told her that "a woman who had studied in California would never ever want to go to a remote part of Canada and work on insects in the forest." Wright did not get an interview for the job the man was referring to. A year later at the same conference Wright derived "enormous satisfaction" by telling the same person about the job that she had taken working for CSIRO with dung beetles "in African game parks, and dodging lions and American Buffalo."

References

Living people
1954 births
Queen's University at Kingston alumni
University of Guelph alumni
University of California, Berkeley alumni
Women entomologists
Canadian entomologists
Australian women scientists
20th-century Canadian women scientists
21st-century Canadian women scientists